Life is a Problem is an  album by Marah, released in 2010.

Track listing
Muskie Moon
Valley Farm Song
Within the Spirit Sagging
Life Is a Problem
High Water
Put Em In the Graveyard
...(Keep Going)
Tramp Art
Together Not Together
Bright Morning Stars

Personnel
David Bielanko (Guitar, Banjo, Vocals, Harmonica, Percussion, Bass, Piano, Organ Pedals, Ukulele)
Christine Smith (BV's, Piano, Organs, Synth, Vocals, Drums, Percussion, Accordion, Fiddle, Xylophone)
Johnny Pisano (Electric and Upright Bass)
Martin Lynds (Drums & Percussion)
Serge Bielanko (Vocals)
Jeff Coolerman Clarke (Bagpipes)
Donnie Pizza Sauce (Acoustic Guitar)
Mike Esser (Marching Band Drum)
Dr. George Koch (Field Recording Vocal)
Fury & Mud (Goat Impressions)

References

2010 albums
Marah (band) albums